Sir Peter William Shelley Yorke Scarlett  (30 March 1905 – 28 December 1987) was a British diplomat who was ambassador to Norway and to the Holy See.

Career
Peter Scarlett was educated at Eton and Christ Church, Oxford. He entered the Foreign Office in 1929 and served in Cairo, Baghdad and Lisbon. He acted as Chargé d’Affaires in Riga 1937–38 and was attached to the representative of Latvia at the coronation of King George VI and Queen Elizabeth in 1937. He served in Brussels from 1938 to 1940 when he was captured by enemy forces but, as a diplomat, was returned to the UK where he resumed duties at the Foreign Office until 1944 when he was appointed to the embassy in Paris under Sir Alfred Duff Cooper. In 1946 he moved to Allied Forces Headquarters at Caserta, southern Italy, then was Counsellor at the Foreign Office 1947–50 and Inspector of HM Diplomatic Service Establishments 1950–52.

Scarlett was British Permanent Representative on the Council of Europe, Strasbourg, 1952–55; HM Ambassador to Norway 1955–60; and finally Minister to the Holy See 1960–65. He retired from the Diplomatic Service in 1965 and was Chairman of the Church of England’s Cathedrals Advisory Committee 1967–81.

Scarlett was appointed CMG in the New Year Honours of 1949, knighted KCVO in 1955 and KCMG in the Queen's Birthday Honours of 1958.

Personal
Peter Scarlett's wife Elisabeth was daughter of Major Sir John Birchall, MP.

See also
British Ambassadors to the Holy See

References
SCARLETT, Sir Peter (William Shelley Yorke), Who Was Who, A & C Black, 1920–2008; online edn, Oxford University Press, Dec 2007, retrieved 18 Feb 2012

1905 births
1987 deaths
People educated at Eton College
Alumni of Christ Church, Oxford
Knights Commander of the Order of St Michael and St George
Knights Commander of the Royal Victorian Order
Ambassadors of the United Kingdom to Norway
Ambassadors of the United Kingdom to the Holy See